Sterno Records was a United Kingdom based record company issuing gramophone records from 1926 through 1935.  The label was a subsidiary of Homophone Records.

See also
 List of record labels

References

British record labels
Record labels established in 1926
Record labels disestablished in 1935